Paithrukam is a 1993 Indian Malayalam-language drama film, directed by Jayaraaj, starring Suresh Gopi, Narendra Prasad and Jayaram. Scripted by Kaloor Dennis, this film revolves around a traditional Brahmin family and the fight between their beliefs and atheism.

Plot
Devadathan Chemmathiripadu (Narendra Prasad), a vedic scholar is widely respected by everyone. He successfully completed Somayagam and has gained the title Somayajippadu. Leading a simple life away from all the chaos, Somayajippadu has two sons, Somadathan (Suresh Gopi) and Chithrabhanu (Jayaram). While Somadathan left for Delhi to become a journalist, Chitrabhanu stayed along with his father in order to assist him. Bhanu Namboothiri is now a chief priest in the nearby temple. During his Delhi days, Somadathan became interested in atheism and became associated with several radical groups. One day he returns to his village to meet up with his family. But, upon arriving home, he finds the daily rituals irritating and starts questioning them. He denounces Vedas as superstition and starts advocating atheism among the villagers.

In the beginning, Somayaji does not take it seriously, slowly he becomes to feel it is unbearable. He advises Dathan to lead a Brahmin's life, to which Dathan shoots back that he is no longer a Brahmin and had given up his Yajnopavitam, long ago. This shocks Somayaji, who asks him to stay away from his house. Dathan steps out of his house and marries Gayathri (Geetha), another atheist and his lover. The couple, in their efforts to win out against superstition, decide to stay at an old haunted house, which people believe is dangerous. They along with fellow radicals clean up the place and destroy the idols of Nagas and the small worship place.

In the meantime, Bhanu Namboothiri falls in love with a girl in the neighboring village, Gouri. He requests his mom (Nanditha Bose) to speak about this to Somayaji. But, Somayaji reveals that Bhanu has several issues in his horoscope and at the age of 27, even his life could be in danger. This breaks him down, and he commits suicide. Somadathan accused his father for his brother's death and his anger turns into hatred. Meanwhile, Gayathri gets pregnant twice, but both end up in miscarriage. The people cite it as a reason for Sarpadosha. She dreams of serpents and begins to believe their act of destroying the idols of Nagas were the reason for the abortions.

One evening, while returning home, Somadathan finds Gayathri lighting a lamp for the idols at a cleaned up shrine, which infuriates him. She tries to justify her rationale and make him change his mind. But he stubbornly tells her that to stay with him, she needs to follow his principles. Gayathri storms out the house and arrives at Somayaji's house. Somadathan's mother welcomes her and performs special pujas for her, because she is pregnant for third time. She then gives birth to a boy. Somadathan argues with Somayaji that he should not be brought up as a Brahmin and no vedic rituals should be conducted for him.

In the meantime, a group of people arrive at Somayaji house to perform an Athirathram, in order to please Lord Indra and make it rain. Athirathram is the highest form of yagas, according to Vedas and if performed perfectly, it will result in heavy rain. The stage is set and all preparations are on full swing. A group of atheists under the leadership of Somadathan decides to oppose it, exposing the meaningless of such rituals. He challenges Somayaji and asks him if no heavy rains fall, will he give up Vedas and accepts atheism, to which Somayaji agrees. But he also put forward another question to Dathan that if it rains, will he be ready to follow his father's way, to which Dathan agrees. On the last day of Athirathram, it rain severely and Dathan accepts defeat. Somyaji arrives at home and continues his meditation in his home's inner altar, and as an oblation sacrifices his life to the fire. Somadathan then takes up his father's path and becomes the next priest of the family.

Cast
 Suresh Gopi as Somadathan
 Jayaram as Chithrabhanu
 Narendra Prasad
 Maniyanpilla Raju
 Geetha as Gayathri
 Padmini
 Bobby Kottarakkara
 Hakim Rawther
 Nanditha Bose
 Sindhu Shyam

Soundtrack
The acclaimed soundtrack of this movie was composed by S. P. Venkatesh for which the acclaimed lyrics were penned by Kaithapram. All the songs of this movie were instant hits.

Awards

 Kerala State Film Award for Best Lyricist - Kaithapram
 Filmfare Award for Best Music Director – Malayalam - S. P. Venkatesh

References

External links
 

1990s Malayalam-language films
1993 drama films
1993 films
Films scored by S. P. Venkatesh